Alex Machin (6 July 1920 – 18 February 2005) was an English footballer who played for Chelsea and Plymouth Argyle as an inside forward. Machin signed for Chelsea in July 1944 and remained with the club for four years, making 61 appearances and scoring 9 goals.

Notes

References

External links
 Alex Machin profile at stamford-bridge.com

Chelsea F.C. players
Plymouth Argyle F.C. players
English footballers
1920 births
2005 deaths
English Football League players
Association football inside forwards